{{Infobox company
| name           = Unaitas Sacco Society Limited
| logo           = Unaitas Logo.png
| type           = Private
| slogan = 
| foundation     = 1993
| location       = Nairobi, Kenya
| key_people     = KinoroChairmanMartin MuhohoChief Executive Officer
| num of employees  = 
| revenue        = :Aftertax:KSh428 million ($US4.29 million) (2015)
| assets         = KSh1.3 billion (US$93.2 million) (2015)
| industry       = Financial services
| products       = Loans, Savings, ATM Debit Cards, Mobile Banking Service
| homepage       = 
}}Unaitas Sacco Society Limited, whose full name is Unaitas Savings & Credit Cooperative Society Limited, also Unaitas Sacco', is a savings and credit co-operative society (Sacco) in Kenya. Membership includes individuals, investment groups and small businesses.

Overview
Unaitas Sacco is a medium-tier financial services provider in Kenya. , the society's asset base was valued at KSh9.3 billion (US$93.2 million), and a loan book of approximately KSh7.42 billion (approx. US$74.35 million). At that time, shareholders' equity was valued at more than KSh3.6 billion (approx. US$36.07 million) and membership was more than 230,000.

History
The society was established in 1993 as Murang'a Tea Growers' Society, by a group of farmers, who pooled resources to create a financial institution where they could save and borrow at affordable rates. In 2007, the Sacco expanded beyond Murang'a and it admitted members who are not tea growers and small businesses. The name was changed to Muramati Sacco'' and eventually to Unaitas Sacco in 2012.

Branches
, the society maintains a network of branches at the following locations:

 Cardinal Otunga Branch - Cardinal Otunga Plaza, Kaunda Street, Nairobi
 Naivasha Branch - Penibrah House, Moi Avenue, Naivasha
 Kawangware Branch - Muhu Holdings House, Naivasha Road, Kawangare, Nairobi
 Juja Branch - Opposite JKUAT University Main Gate, Juja.
 Thika Branch - Kwame Nkrumah Road, Thika
 Mlolongo Branch - Old Mombasa Road, Nairobi
 Kasarani Branch - Kasarani Mwiki Road, Kasarani, Nairobi
 Ongata Rongai Branch - Rongai Business Hub, Ongata Rongai, Nairobi 
 Temple Road Branch - Gatkim Plaza, Temple Road, Nairobi
 Muranga Branch - Unaitas Building, Murang'a
 Kangare Branch - Unaitas Building, Kangare
 Kanyenya-ini Branch - Unaitas Building, Kanyenya-ini
 Gatura Branch - Unaitas Building, Gatura
 Kahatia Branch - Unaitas Building, Kahatia
 Kiria-ini Branch - Kiria-ini - Murang'a Road, Kiria-ini
Kisumu Branch - Kisumu - Kakamega  Road, opposite Kibuye Market
Kisii Branch - Opposite Tuskys Echiro
 Mununga Branch - Mununga
 Kangema Branch - Kangema
 Githumu Branch - Unaitas Building, Murang'a
 Nakuru Pioneer Branch - Pioneer Building, Mburu Gichia Road, Nakuru
 Gatundu Branch - Gatundu House, Nairobi

See also
 Imarisha Sacco
 Mwalimu Sacco
 Kenya Banks
 Muramati Sacco

References

External links
  Website of Unaitas Sacco Society Limited
  Website of Sacco Societies Regulatory Authority of Kenya

Banks established in 1993
1993 establishments in Kenya
Companies based in Nairobi